Bayliss Levrett (February 14, 1914 – March 13, 2002) was an American racecar driver from Jacksonville, Florida. He died in Reno, Nevada at the age of 88 after a long battle with Alzheimer's disease.

Award
Levrett is a 2007 inductee in the National Sprint Car Hall of Fame.

Indy 500 results

World Championship career summary
The Indianapolis 500 was part of the FIA World Championship from 1950 through 1960. Drivers competing at Indy during those years were credited with World Championship points and participation. Bayliss Levrett participated in 1 World Championship race but scored no World Championship points.

References

1914 births
2002 deaths
Deaths from Alzheimer's disease
Neurological disease deaths in Nevada
Indianapolis 500 drivers
National Sprint Car Hall of Fame inductees
Racing drivers from Florida
Racing drivers from Jacksonville, Florida
Sportspeople from Jacksonville, Florida